Mohini is a 1948 Indian Tamil-language film directed by Lanka Sathiyam and produced by M. Somasundharam. It features T. S. Balaiah, V. N. Janaki, Madhuri Devi, M. G. Ramachandran, Pulimoottai Ramaswami, M. N. Nambiar and R. Balasubramaniam.

Cast 

Male cast
 T. S. Balaiah as Mohankumar
 M. G. Ramachandran as Vijayakumar
 R. Balasubramaniam
 Pulimootai Ramasami as Sathyabala King
 M. N. Nambiar
 M. A. Ganapathi
 C. P. Kittan
 Nott Annaji Rao

Dance
 Lalitha & Padmini
Female cast
 V. N. Janaki as Mohini
 Madhuri Devi as Kumari
 M. S. S. Bhagyam
Kumari's Dance Group
 K. Malathi
 R. Lakshmisundaram
 D. Bharathi
 C. A. Nirmala Devi
 B. R. Lakshmi
 K. Rathnam
 M. D. Kamala Bai
 T. Ranganayaki

Soundtrack 
Music composed by S. M. Subbaiah Naidu & C. R. Subburaman. Lyrics were penned by T. K. Sundara Vathiyar and 'Bhoomi' Balakadas. The song Aahaa Ivar Yaaradi was a hit. C. R. Subburaman composed the music for this song. G. Ramanathan went to Subburaman's home and congratulated him for the excellent composition in classical music.

Reception 
The Indian Express wrote, "The story is so full of action that it is difficult to narrate it succinctly".

References

External links 
 

1948 films
1940s Tamil-language films
Indian black-and-white films
Films scored by S. M. Subbaiah Naidu
Films scored by C. R. Subbaraman
Jupiter Pictures films